Villyan Bijev (born 3 January 1993) is a Bulgarian professional footballer who currently plays as a midfielder for Central Valley Fuego FC in USL League One.

Early life
Villyan Bijev was born in Sofia, Bulgaria, and moved with his family to the United States at the age of five in 1998. He grew up in Fresno, California and began his youth career with the Bullard Flyers U-12 local school team. In 2008, at the age of 15, Bijev joined the Clovis-based California Odyssey. He also played for the Edison High School team in Fresno, graduating in 2011. He was named to the 2010 Parade All-America soccer team.

Career

Liverpool
Bijev originally signed to play college soccer at the University of Washington in the fall of 2011, but in July 2011, Liverpool invited Bijev for a trial with the Under 18s. He left a great impression, netting five goals in two pre-season friendly games, earning himself a permanent switch to the Merseyside outfit in the process on a reported three-year deal with an additional two-year option. Liverpool officially announced the signing from US outfit California Odyssey on 31 August 2011.

He was released from the club at the end of the 2013–14 season.

Loan spells
The same day he signed for Liverpool, it was announced that Bijev had signed on loan for German side Fortuna Düsseldorf for the 2011–12 season. Bijev played mostly for Fortuna B-squad, where he scored 4 goals in 16 games. He appeared once for the first team, playing the last 8 minutes of a 2–1 away loss against Hansa Rostock on 5 April 2012, in the place of Adam Matuszczyk.

On 27 August 2012, Bijev joined Norwegian First Division side IK Start on a one-year loan, as this will help him gain the necessary work permits to play in England. Bijev made his debut for the club in a 2–1 win over Hødd. Though he made one appearance, the club would be promoted to Tippeligaen.

Slavia Sofia
After being released by Liverpool, Bijev joined Bulgarian A Football Group side Slavia Sofia. He made his league debut for the club in a 4–1 home win against Marek Dupnitsa on 19 July 2014. Bijev marked his debut with a goal, scoring the fourth. In December 2014, his contract with Slavia was terminated by mutual consent.

Cherno More
On 12 January 2015, Bijev signed with Cherno More Varna on a one-and-a-half-year deal. He made his debut on 27 February, starting in a 2–0 home league win against Slavia Sofia. Bijev scored his first official goal for Cherno More on 5 March, netting the fourth in a 5–0 success at Lokomotiv Gorna Oryahovitsa for the Bulgarian Cup.

Return to the US
Bijev returned to the United States in 2016, playing for USL Championship sides Portland Timbers 2 and Sacramento Republic FC. In March 2021, Bijev joined Oklahoma City Energy FC. After OKC Energy announced a year-long hiatus, Bijev made a return to his hometown of Fresno by signing with USL League One expansion club Central Valley Fuego FC. On 8 June 2022, Bijev was named USL League One Player of the Month for May, in recognition of his three goals and one assist which led Central Valley to their first ever unbeaten month.

International career
Born in Bulgaria but raised in the United States and holding American citizenship, Bijev is eligible for both nations. He has represented the United States at the under-18 and under-20 level and Bulgaria at the under-21 level. He has yet to represent either at the senior level.

Career statistics

Honors

Cherno More
 Bulgarian Cup: 2014–15
 Bulgarian Supercup: 2015

References

External links
 

1993 births
Living people
Footballers from Sofia
Sportspeople from Fresno, California
Bulgarian footballers
Bulgaria under-21 international footballers
American soccer players
Parade High School All-Americans (boys' soccer)
United States men's youth international soccer players
United States men's under-20 international soccer players
Bulgarian emigrants to the United States
Association football forwards
Liverpool F.C. players
Fortuna Düsseldorf II players
Fortuna Düsseldorf players
IK Start players
PFC Slavia Sofia players
PFC Cherno More Varna players
Portland Timbers 2 players
Sacramento Republic FC players
OKC Energy FC players
Central Valley Fuego FC players
2. Bundesliga players
Norwegian First Division players
First Professional Football League (Bulgaria) players
USL Championship players
American expatriate soccer players
Expatriate footballers in Germany
Expatriate footballers in Norway
Soccer players from California